Osmán Morote Barrionuevo known with the alias of Comrade Nicolas was one of Efraín Morote Best's sons.  At one point in his life, he became the Shining Path's second-in-command. His two siblings, Arturo and Katia, also became members of the Shining Path, a Maoist insurgency in Peru that launched a terrorist movement.

He was arrested by the Peruvian police on June 11, 1988, on terrorism charges, and was sentenced to 20 years in prison.  In March 1992 he appealed to the Supreme Court of Peru and his sentence was reduced to 15 years.  The same year, President Alberto Fujimori's regime opened a new trial and Morote was sentenced to life in prison. A new trial started in June 2003.

Members of the Shining Path
People convicted on terrorism charges
People imprisoned on charges of terrorism
Peruvian communists
Peruvian prisoners sentenced to life imprisonment
Prisoners sentenced to life imprisonment by Peru
Peruvian revolutionaries